Joanne Gilbert (born July 17, 1932) is an American television and film actress.

Biography
Gilbert was born in Chicago, Illinois, and grew up in Hollywood, California. She is the daughter of American lyricist Ray Gilbert who is best known for writing the lyrics of the song Zip-a-Dee-Doo-Dah.

She pursued an unsuccessful career as a fashion model in New York City, and then moved back to California, performing as a nightclub singer before becoming a film actress. Her movies include Red Garters starring Rosemary Clooney and Jack Carson, and The Great Man. Her last film performance was in 1958. She worked much of the next decade in TV dramas.

She has been married to Edward Louis Rissien and actor/producer Danny Arnold, and is the step-daughter of actress Janis Paige.

Selected filmography
 Houdini (1953) - girl (uncredited)
 Red Garters (1954) - Sheila Winthrop
 The Ford Television Theatre (1954) - Mary-Jo Dixon (episode: The Mason-Dixon Line)
 Good Morning, Miss Dove (1955) - school girl (uncredited)
 The Great Man (1956) - Ginny
 Ride Out for Revenge (1957) - Pretty Willow
 The High Cost of Loving (1958) - Syd Heyward
 Perry Mason (TV series) (1959) - Faith Foster (episode: The Case of the Lost Last Act) 
 Zane Grey Theater (1958) - Jennie Cannon (episode: Utopia, Wyoming)
 The Outer Limits (TV Series) (1963) - Barbara Scott (episode: O.B.I.T.)
 Ben Casey (1966) - Miss Clauson (episode: Smile, Baby, Smile, It's Only Twenty Dols of Pain)

References

External links 
 
 
 

1932 births
Living people
American film actresses
20th-century American actresses
21st-century American women